(lit. "Nameless") is a 2013 Japanese-South Korean action thriller film directed by Kim Sung-soo based on a novel by Shiro Tsukasaki. In 2014, the film was released theatrically in Japan on January 24, and South Korea on May 29.

Cast
 Hidetoshi Nishijima as Ishigami Taketo
 Kim Hyo-jin as Kang Ji-won
 Yōko Maki as Miyuki
 Yuri Nakamura as Han Yu-ri
 Manabu Hamada as Ibuki
 Masatō Ibu as Dr. Sato
 Lee Geung-young 
 Nahana as Koyoko
 Park Hae-joon as Kurosaki

Reception
The film grossed  at the Japanese box office.

Choi Sang-muk won the Bronze Medal for Cinematography at the 2014 Golden Cinema Festival.

References

External links
 

2013 films
2013 action thriller films
Japanese action thriller films
South Korean action thriller films
Films scored by Kenji Kawai
2010s Japanese films
2010s South Korean films